As of 2018, there are 440 kilometres of national roads, 408 kilometres of departmental road, and 1,311 kilometres of municipal roads in French Guiana. There is no motorway.

RN1 connects Cayenne with Saint-Laurent-du-Maroni. RN2 connects Cayenne with Saint-Georges.

Following a treaty between France and Brazil signed in July 2005, the Oyapock River Bridge over the Oyapock River was built and completed in 2011, becoming the first land crossing ever between French Guiana and the rest of the world (there is a ferry crossing to Albina, Suriname). The bridge was officially opened on 18 March 2017, however the border post introduction on the Brazilian caused additional delays. As of 2020, it possible to drive uninterrupted from Cayenne to Macapá, the capital of the state of Amapá in Brazil.

RN3 to Dégrad des Cannes, the main harbour, and RN4 to Cayenne – Félix Eboué Airport became departmental routes in 2007, and merely retain the name.

There are plans to built a Route nationale from Saint-Laurent-du-Maroni to Maripasoula, however as of 2021, the road ends south of Apatou.

Departmental roads
The most important departmental roads in French Guiana in 2007 are:

References

Roads in French Guiana